FilmAid is a non-profit humanitarian organization that uses film to educate and entertain displaced people around the world. FilmAid was founded during the Kosovo War in 1999 by producer Caroline Baron (Capote, Monsoon Wedding) to assist with refugee communities in Macedonia suffering the effects of war, poverty, displacement and disaster.

References

External links
FilmAid website

FilmAid
FilmAid
FilmAid